Going cold turkey means withdrawing from a habit or addiction abruptly.

Cold Turkey or cold turkey may also refer to:

Film
 Cold Turkey (1951 film), an animated short film starring Pluto
 Cold Turkey (1971 film), a comedy by Norman Lear
 Cold Turkey (2003 film), an Australian film directed by Steven McGregor
 Cold Turkey (2013 film), an independent film starring Alicia Witt

Other uses
 "Cold Turkey", a 1969 song by John Lennon
 "Cold Turkey", a song by Yung Beef from ADROMICFMS 4
 "Cold Turkey" (Bump in the Night), a television episode wherein a turkey comes to life

See also
 Turkey (bird)
 Turkey (country)